Spinavaculidae is a family of cnidarians belonging to the order Multivalvulida.

Genera:
 Octospina Hsieh & Xiao, 1993

References

Multivalvulida
Cnidarian families